Henry Barbour may refer to:

Henry E. Barbour (1877–1945), US Representative from California
Henry Barbour (MP for Reading), MP for Reading in 1384 and 1391
Henry Barbour (MP for Melcombe Regis), MP for Melcombe Regis in 1414
Henry Gray Barbour (1886–1943), American physiologist and pharmacologist

See also